Heliothis scutuligera is a species of moth of the family Noctuidae first described by Achille Guenée in 1852. It is found in the Western, Eastern and Northern Cape of South Africa, Lesotho KwaZulu-Natal, Transvaal, Botswana, Zimbabwe and Malawi.

External links
 
 

Heliothis
Fauna of Lesotho
Moths described in 1852